The Mount Kilimanjaro International Convention Centre (MKICC) is a proposed convention centre in the northern Tanzanian city of Arusha.

References

Convention centres in Tanzania
Buildings and structures in Arusha